Iain Fletcher is a British actor, best known for his role as DC Rod Skase in the ITV1 drama series The Bill. He portrayed the character for six years from 1994 to 2000.

Other television credits include Band of Brothers, Murphy’s Law, Family Affairs, Holby City, Waterloo Road, Casualty (TV series) and Doctors.

Stage credits include Sam Carmichael in the musical Mamma Mia! in the West End and Bill Sikes in Cameron Mackintosh's Production of  Oliver!.

External links
 

English male television actors
Living people
1967 births